The Kninjas, also known as the Red Berets, was a Serb paramilitary unit, a volunteer militia supporting the Army of the Republic of Serb Krajina in the Croatian War (1991–95). It was based in Knin, the capital of breakaway SAO Krajina that became the Republic of Serb Krajina (RSK). It was led by Serbian-Australian Dragan Vasiljković (born 1954), known as "Captain Dragan". 

It was one of several notable Serb paramilitary units, alongside the White Eagles, Arkan's Tigers, the Falcons, and others.

History
Vasiljković, who had served in the Australian army, had returned to Yugoslavia in 1990 during the Croatian independence movement, eventually being hired as an instructor for volunteers in the summer of 1991. At this time, Belgrade daily Politika published a comic book named The Demons Return that featured the Kninjas fighting the Croats with martial arts. The unit, deemed elite, was a special unit that answered in part to Knin police chief Milan Martić. According to Martić himself, he was supplied of equipment and weapons mostly from the Serbian government. It became the special forces of the RSK Interior Ministry. The name, a pun on "Knin" and "Ninjas", was informal; the unit did not have an official name, but the term was used for the mostly Vasiljković-trained volunteers. Veterans later joined the Special Operations Unit of FR Yugoslavia. 

Vasiljković served a 15-year prison sentence for war crimes. He was released from prison on March 28, 2020. The emblem was a customized Serbian cross, with blue background and inverted firesteels.

Cultural impact 
The Serbian nationalist singer Baja Mali Knindža chose his stagename in honour of the Kninjas. He has also recorded a well-known song called Knindže Krajišnici ("Kninjas of the Krajina").

References

Sources

Paramilitary organizations in the Yugoslav Wars
Paramilitary organizations based in Serbia
Military units and formations of the Croatian War of Independence
Military units and formations of the Bosnian War
Serbian war crimes in the Croatian War of Independence
1991 establishments in Serbia
1991 establishments in Croatia
Organizations established in 1991
Defunct paramilitary organizations